Dorothy Shepard was a modernist designer noted for her work for Philip K. Wrigley establishing Catalina Island, California as a tourist destination and advertising Wrigley’s Chewing Gum.

Biography 
Born Dorothy Van Gorder in 1906 to Arthur Grant Van Gorder and Jessie Van Gorder of Berkeley, California, she showed an early aptitude for learning, art, dance, and theater. She graduated from high school as class valedictorian in less than 3 years. Then at California School of Arts and Crafts, she once again graduated in 3 years and was again class valedictorian. In 1927, just after her graduation, she was hired as an artist at Foster & Kleiser Advertising in San Francisco.

Dorothy and her husband Otis were hired by Philip K. Wrigley to be the creative team for all of his corporate interests. In 1936 Wrigley asked Dorothy to spearhead the development of newly acquired advertising space in Times Square in New York City. She designed a massive neon Wrigley display – eight stories tall and one block long – one of the largest neon installations ever built, even to this day. The sign depicted a fish blowing bubbles as part of the advertisement for Wrigley chewing gum. The next year, she won a National Advertising Council Award for the billboard. She also won a prize for her advertisement for Pabst beer.

In 1934, Shepard and her husband went to Catalina Island at the request of P.K. Wrigley. Shepard and her husband Otis designed the street signage, interior designs, tile design, textiles, murals, the staff uniforms, leaflets, pamphlets, and advertisements found throughout the island.

Personal life 
She married Otis Shepard in 1929. While they would reunite later in life, Dorothy divorced Otis in the 1940’s. They came to be together again in the early 1960’s, remaining together until Otis’s death in 1969. Dorothy Shepard died in December of 2000, in Belvedere, CA.

Further reading

References 

1906 births
2000 deaths
American women illustrators
Women in advertising
Women graphic designers